"Disappear" is a song by American rock band Motion City Soundtrack, released on October 19, 2009 as the lead single from the group's fourth studio album, My Dinosaur Life (2010). The song's music video was released on November 19, 2009.

Background
"Disappear" was considered by frontman Justin Pierre to be the darkest on the album, trying to capture a "crazy energy" that he felt he lacked on the band's previous effort, Even If It Kills Me (2007). Much of the group too considered it a more "evil, […] progressive" cut. The song, like album track "Delirium", drop Jesse Johnson's keyboards from the band's sound.

Release and reception
In October 2009, the band released the song as a free download on their website, with a music video online for the song on November 19, 2009.

Alternative Press considered it "dark, swirling second-wave emo recalling the best the mid-to-late '90s underground had to offer."

Personnel 

Motion City Soundtrack
Justin Pierre – lead vocals, guitar
Joshua Cain – guitar, vocals
Jesse Johnson – Moog, keyboard
Matt Taylor – bass guitar, percussion
Tony Thaxton – drums

Production
Mark Hoppus – producer

References

Motion City Soundtrack songs
2009 singles
2010 songs
Columbia Records singles
Songs written by Joshua Cain
Songs written by Justin Pierre